Ahlerich (1971–1992) was a Westphalian gelding. With his rider Reiner Klimke, he won the 1984 and 1988 team gold medals in Olympic Grand Prix dressage and the individual gold in 1984.

Klimke purchased Ahlerich by auction in 1975, in Warendorf, for the record price of 42.000 DM (ca. US$26,600).

He is the subject of a book written by Klimke, Ahlerich von der Remonte zum Dressur-Weltmeister; ein exemplarischer Ausbildungsweg (1984), published in translation by Courtney Searls-Ridge as Ahlerich: The Making of a Dressage World Champion in 1986.

References 

Dressage horses
1971 animal births
1992 animal deaths
Horses in the Olympics